Quercus peduncularis is an oak native to Mexico and Central America, ranging from Jalisco to Honduras.

It is placed in the white oak group, Quercus section Quercus.

Description

Distribution
Quercus peduncularis is native to central, southeastern and southwestern Mexico, including Veracruz, Belize, El Salvador, Guatemala and Honduras.

References

External links
photo of herbarium specimen at Missouri Botanical Garden, collected in México State in 1934

peduncularis
Flora of Belize
Flora of El Salvador
Flora of Guatemala
Flora of Honduras
Trees of Central Mexico
Trees of Veracruz
Trees of Southeastern Mexico
Trees of Southwestern Mexico
Oaks of Mexico
Plants described in 1801
Flora of the Central American pine–oak forests